In mathematics, the equidistribution theorem is the statement that the sequence

a, 2a, 3a, ... mod 1

is uniformly distributed on the circle , when a is an irrational number.  It is a special case of the ergodic theorem where one takes the normalized angle measure .

History
While this theorem was proved in 1909 and 1910 separately by Hermann Weyl, Wacław Sierpiński and Piers Bohl, variants of this theorem continue to be studied to this day. 

In 1916, Weyl proved that the sequence a, 22a, 32a, ... mod 1 is uniformly distributed on the unit interval.  In 1937, Ivan Vinogradov proved that the sequence pn a mod 1 is uniformly distributed, where pn is the nth prime.  Vinogradov's proof was a byproduct of the odd Goldbach conjecture, that every sufficiently large odd number is the sum of three primes.

George Birkhoff, in 1931, and Aleksandr Khinchin, in 1933, proved that the generalization x + na, for almost all x,  is equidistributed on any Lebesgue measurable subset of the unit interval.  The corresponding generalizations for the Weyl and Vinogradov results were proven by Jean Bourgain in 1988.

Specifically, Khinchin showed that the identity

holds for almost all x and any Lebesgue integrable function ƒ.  In modern formulations, it is asked under what conditions the identity

might hold, given some general sequence bk.

One noteworthy result is that the sequence 2ka mod 1 is uniformly distributed for almost all, but not all, irrational a. Similarly, for the sequence bk = 2ka, for every irrational a, and almost all x, there exists a function ƒ for which the sum diverges. In this sense, this sequence is considered to be a universally bad averaging sequence, as opposed to bk = k, which is termed a universally good averaging sequence, because it does not have the latter shortcoming.

A powerful general result is Weyl's criterion, which shows that equidistribution is equivalent to having a non-trivial estimate for the exponential sums formed with the sequence as exponents. For the case of  multiples of a, Weyl's criterion reduces the problem to summing finite geometric series.

See also
 Diophantine approximation
 Low-discrepancy sequence
Dirichlet's approximation theorem
Three-gap theorem

References

Historical references
 P. Bohl, (1909) Über ein in der Theorie der säkularen Störungen vorkommendes Problem, J. reine angew. Math. 135, pp. 189–283.
 
 W. Sierpinski, (1910) Sur la valeur asymptotique d'une certaine somme, Bull Intl. Acad. Polonaise des Sci. et des Lettres (Cracovie) series A, pp. 9–11.

Modern references
 Joseph M. Rosenblatt and Máté Weirdl, Pointwise ergodic theorems via harmonic analysis, (1993) appearing in Ergodic Theory and its Connections with Harmonic Analysis, Proceedings of the 1993 Alexandria Conference, (1995) Karl E. Petersen and Ibrahim A. Salama, eds., Cambridge University Press, Cambridge, . (An extensive survey of the ergodic properties of generalizations of the equidistribution theorem of shift maps on the unit interval. Focuses on methods developed by Bourgain.)
 Elias M. Stein and Rami Shakarchi, Fourier Analysis. An Introduction, (2003) Princeton University Press, pp 105–113 (Proof of the Weyl's theorem based on Fourier Analysis)

Ergodic theory
Diophantine approximation
Theorems in number theory